The Salvadoran Army (Spanish: Ejército Salvadoreño) is the land branch and largest of the Armed Forces of El Salvador.

History

The Football War

The Football War (also called The Soccer War or 100-hours War) was a term coined by Polish reporter Ryszard Kapuściński to describe a brief conflict between El Salvador and neighbouring Honduras. He argued that the war began after the rival nations traded wins during the qualifying round for the 1970 FIFA World Cup. But this event was not the cause of the war. Tensions had been mounting between both nations for several years because of immigration and economic problems, resulting on the war in 1969. The soccer matches incidents just one of several events that happened during that time. Longstanding tensions between the countries were heightened by media reports on both sides, each accusing the other of hooliganism and violence toward their own football fans. On June 26, 1969, El Salvador dissolved all ties with Honduras, the events were used as a call for nationalist pride for both governments and the media.

On July 14 Salvadoran forces began moving rapidly into Honduras following a series of border clashes. Their progress halted after the Organization of American States (OAS) and the United States brought heavy diplomatic pressure to bear on both governments in an effort to effect a cease-fire.

A ceasefire was ultimately negotiated and signed by July 18, with Salvadoran forces withdrawing from Honduras by August 2 following guarantees of safety for Salvadoran citizens in Honduras by the Honduran government.

The Salvadoran Civil War

By the late 1970s, longstanding socio-economic inequality, human rights violations and the unwillingness of the National Conciliation Party dictatorship to address these problems led to the growth of a social movement. The government responded by assassinating thousands of political opponents and massacring students and protestors on several occasions. The heavy handed response of the government signaled to those identifying with the social movement that peaceful solutions were futile, which led to the growth of an insurgency.

On October 15, 1979, the military government was deposed by a joint military-civilian government calling itself the Revolutionary Government Junta of El Salvador (JRG). The JRG's policies were met with opposition from the military and economic elites and government repression increased, with tens of thousands of civilians being killed in 1980 and 1981 alone. This led to the formation of the Farabundo Martí National Liberation Front (FMLN), which brought on a twelve-year civil war.

The Iraq War

Up to 380 Salvadoran troops, mostly paratroopers, were deployed as part of the Coalition Forces in Iraq between August 2003 and January 2009. They operated alongside the elite Spanish Legion in Najaf. While in Iraq, the Salvadoran contingent suffered 5 dead, and more than 50 wounded.

In 2006 the government of El Salvador approached the Israeli ambassador to El Salvador seeking assistance in modernising its army.

Organizational structure

El Salvador is divided into 6 military zones, each of which has its own infantry brigade:
1st brigade (San Salvador)
2nd brigade (Santa Ana)
3rd brigade (San Miguel)
4th brigade (Chalatenango)
5th brigade (San Vicente)
6th brigade (Usulután)
Furthermore, the army has the following units:
 1 Special Military Security Brigade consisting of 2 Military Police and 2 border security battalions,
 8 infantry detachments with 2 battalions,
 1 Engineer Command with of 2 battalions,
 1 artillery brigade with of 2 field artillery and 2 anti-aircraft battalions,
 1 mechanized cavalry regiment with 2 battalions, and the
 Special Forces Command with 1 Special Operations Group, and 1 Anti-Terrorism Command.
 1 female soldiers battalion on the artillery brigade.

Equipment

Infantry weapons 

The Salvadoran Army/Navy/Marines/Air Force use the same kind of small arm types. Also it uses, telescopic sights, Aimpoint T2 Micro, Ohuhu OH-RG-SC Reflex Sights (panoramic sights), EOTech EXPS 3-0 sights, Barska Holographic Reflex Red Dot Sight, Ozark Rihno Tactical Sights, Trijicon MRO-C sights, EOTech 512..A65 sights, Vortex Optics StrikeFire II sights, Burrist Fast BFire3, Tasco Red Dot Sights, CVLIFE Optics Hunting Rifle Scope 2.5x40e red and green illuminated crosshair mount sights in every kind of assault rifle and rifle the every military branch of the Salvadoran armed forces usage.

Vehicles
Note: Sources are circa 1988, while some equipment listed may no longer be in service.

Armored combat vehicles

Logistic vehicles

Artillery

Air-defence equipment

Notes

Bibliography

External links
defenselink.mil
nationsencyclopedia.com
EL SALVADOR: STANDING TALL
(Salvadorian Armed Forces Research & Development Center)
› Land › Machine Gun Armored Patrol Carriers in Central America(Machine Gun Armored Patrol Carriers in Central America)
Anti-Tank Weapons in Mexico & the Northern Central American Triangle)
Support and Anti-tank Weapons in Latin America: 90mm and 105mm Recoilless Rifles)

Military of El Salvador
Armies by country